The E.B. White Read Aloud Award was established in 2004 by The Association of Booksellers for Children (ABC) to honor books that its membership felt embodied the universal read aloud standards that were created by the work of the author E.B. White.

In 2006 the award was expanded into two categories: The E. B. White Read Aloud Award for Picture Books, and The E. B. White Read Aloud Award for Older Readers. Titles are nominated for the award by ABC booksellers, and then the final decision is made by a committee of booksellers that meets annually in February. The awards are publicly announced, and the official presentation takes place, during a children's dinner at BookExpo America. They are announced in conjunction with Indies Choice Book Awards.

Because the award nominees are generated by independent booksellers based on books they have loved in their own stores, there is no formal outside submission process.

List of prize winners

2019 
MIDDLE READER

 Ghost Boys by Jewell Parker Rhodes (Little, Brown Books for Young Readers)

PICTURE BOOK

 We Don’t Eat Our Classmates by Ryan T. Higgins (Disney-Hyperion)

Middle Reader Honor Books

 The Creature of the Pines (Unicorn Rescue Society) by Adam Gidwitz, Hatem Aly (Illus.) (Dutton Books for Young Readers)
 Front Desk by Kelly Yang (Arthur A. Levine Books)
 Love Sugar Magic: A Dash of Trouble by Anna Meriano, Mirelle Ortega (Illus.) (Walden Pond Press)
 The Serpent’s Secret (Kiranmala and the Kingdom Beyond #1) by Sayantani DasGupta (Scholastic Press)
 Sweep: The Story of a Girl and Her Monster by Jonathan Auxier (Amulet Books)

Picture Book Honor Books

 The Day You Begin by Jacqueline Woodson, Rafael López (Illus.) (Nancy Paulsen Books)
 Harriet Gets Carried Away by Jessie Sima (Simon & Schuster Books for Young Readers)
 How to Be a Lion by Ed Vere (Doubleday Books for Young Readers)
 The Rabbit Listened by Cori Doerrfeld (Dial Books)
 Thank You Omu by Oge Mora (Little, Brown Books for Young Readers)

2018

MIDDLE READER

 Wishtree, by Katherine Applegate (Feiwel & Friends)

PICTURE BOOK

 The Wolf, the Duck, and the Mouse, by Mac Barnett, Jon Klassen (Illus.) (Candlewick)

HONOR AWARDS – MIDDLE READER

 The Epic Fail of Arturo Zamora by Pablo Cartaya (Viking Books for Young Readers)
 The First Rule of Punk by Celia C. Pérez (Viking Books for Young Readers)
 One Last Word by Nikki Grimes (Bloomsbury USA Children's Books)
 Refugee by Alan Gratz (Scholastic)
 The Stars Beneath Our Feet by David Barclay Moore (Knopf Books for Young Readers)

HONOR AWARDS – PICTURE BOOK

 After the Fall (How Humpty Dumpty Got Back Up Again) by Dan Santat (Roaring Brook Press)
 Alfie (The Turtle That Disappeared) by Thyra Heder (Harry N. Abrams)
 Come With Me by Holly M. McGhee, Pascal Lemaître (G.P. Putnam's Sons Books for Young Readers)
 Dragons Love Tacos 2: The Sequel by Adam Rubin, Daniel Salmieri (Illus.) (Dial Books)
 Escargot by Dashka Slater, Sydney Hanson (Illus.) (Farrar, Straus and Giroux Books for Young Readers)

2017 
MIDDLE READER

 The Girl Who Drank the Moon, by Kelly Barnhill (Algonquin Young Readers)

PICTURE BOOK

 Du Iz Tak?, by Carson Ellis (Candlewick)

HONOR AWARDS – MIDDLE READER

 As Brave As You, by Jason Reynolds (Atheneum/Caitlyn Dlouhy Books)
 The Inquisitor's Tale: Or, The Three Magical Children and Their Holy Dog, by Adam Gidwitz, Hatem Aly (Illus.) (Dutton Books for Young Readers)
 All Rise for the Honorable Perry T. Cook, by Leslie Connor (Katherine Tegen Books)
 The Best Man, by Richard Peck (Dial Books)
 When the Sea Turned to Silver, by Grace Lin (Little, Brown Books for Young Readers)

HONOR AWARDS – PICTURE BOOK

 School's First Day of School, by Adam Rex, Christian Robinson (Illus.) (Roaring Brook Press)
 Preaching to the Chickens: The Story of Young John Lewis, by Jabari Asim, E.B. Lewis (Illus.) (Nancy Paulsen Books)
 There's a Bear on My Chair, by Ross Collins (Nosy Crow)
 Ada's Violin: The Story of the Recycled Orchestra of Paraguay, by Susan Hood, Sally Wern Comport (Illus.) (Simon & Schuster Books for Young Readers)
 When Green Becomes Tomatoes: Poems for All Seasons, by Julie Fogliano, Julie Morstad (Illus.) (Roaring Brook Press)

2016 

MIDDLE READER

 The Thing About Jellyfish, by Ali Benjamin (Little, Brown Books for Young Readers)

PICTURE BOOK

 Mother Bruce, by Ryan T. Higgins (Disney-Hyperion)

HONOR AWARDS – MIDDLE READER

 The Blackthorn Key, by Kevin Sands (Aladdin)
 Crenshaw, by Katherine Applegate (Feiwel & Friends)
 George, by Alex Gino (Scholastic Press)
 Roller Girl, by Victoria Jamieson (Dial Books for Young Readers)
 Unusual Chickens for the Exceptional Poultry Farmer, by Kelly Jones (Knopf Books for Young Readers)

HONOR AWARDS – PICTURE BOOK

 Leo: A Ghost Story, by Mac Barnett, Christian Robinson (Illus.) (Chronicle Books)
 The Princess and the Pony, by Kate Beaton (Arthur A. Levine Books)
 Red: A Crayon's Story, by Michael Hall (Greenwillow)
 Toys Meet Snow: Being the Wintertime Adventures of a Curious Stuffed Buffalo, a Sensitive Plush Stingray, and a Book-Loving Rubber Ball, by Emily Jenkins, Paul O. Zelinsky (Illus.) (Schwartz & Wade)
 Waiting, by Kevin Henkes (Greenwillow)

2015
MIDDLE READER

Brown Girl Dreaming, by Jacqueline Woodson (Nancy Paulsen Books)

PICTURE BOOK

Sam and Dave Dig a Hole, by Mac Barnett, Jon Klassen (Illus.) (Candlewick)

HONOR AWARDS – MIDDLE READER
 The Boundless, by Kenneth Oppel, Jim Tierney (Illus.) (Simon & Schuster Books for Young Readers)
 The Fourteenth Goldfish, by Jennifer L. Holm (Random House Books for Young Readers)
 A Snicker of Magic, by Natalie Lloyd (Scholastic)
 The Terrible Two, by Mac Barnett and Jory John, Kevin Cornell (Illus.) (Amulet Books)
 The War That Saved My Life, by Kimberly Brubaker Bradley (Dial Books for Young Readers)
HONOR AWARDS – PICTURE BOOK
 Goodnight Already!, by Jory John, Benji Davies (Illus.) (HarperCollins)
 Kid Sheriff and the Terrible Toads, by Bob Shea, Lane Smith (Illus.) (Roaring Brook Press)
 Last Stop on Market Street, by Matt de la Peña, Christian Robinson (Illus.) (Putnam Young Readers)
 The Smallest Girl in the Smallest Grade, by Justin Roberts, Christian Robinson (Illus.) (Putnam Young Readers)
 This Is a Moose, by Richard T. Morris, Tom Lichtenheld (Illus.) (Little, Brown Books for Young Readers)

2014
Picture Books 
   The Day the Crayons Quit, by Drew Daywalt, Oliver Jeffers (Illus.) (Philomel)

Middle Reader  
   Flora and Ulysses ,  by Kate DiCamillo, K.G. Campbell (Illus.) (Candlewick)

E.B. WHITE READ-ALOUD HONOR AWARDS – MIDDLE READER
 Counting By 7s, by Holly Goldberg Sloan (Dial Books for Young Readers)
 The Mouse With the Question Mark Tail, by Richard Peck, Kelly Murphy (Illus.) (Dial Books for Young Readers)
 Ophelia and the Marvelous Boy, by Karen Foxlee (Knopf Books for Young Readers)
 Rooftoppers, by Katherine Rundell, Terry Fan (Illus.) (Simon & Schuster Books for Young Readers)
 The Year of Billy Miller, by Kevin Henkes (Greenwillow Books)

E.B. WHITE READ-ALOUD HONOR AWARDS – PICTURE BOOK
 Crankenstein, by Samantha Berger, Dan Santat (Illus.) (Little, Brown Books for Young Readers)
 Dream Animals: A Bedtime Journey, by Emily Winfield Martin (Random House Books for Young Readers)
 Mr. Tiger Goes Wild, by Peter Brown (Little, Brown Books for Young Readers)
 Unicorn Thinks He's Pretty Great, by Bob Shea (Disney-Hyperion)
 Warning: Do Not Open This Book! by Adam Lehrhaupt, Matthew Forsythe (Illus.) (Paula Wiseman Books)

2013
Picture Books 
 Extra Yarn, by Mac Barnett and Jon Klassen (iillus.) (Balzer + Bray)

Middle Reader  
 Wonder,  by R.J. Palacio (Knopf Books for Young Readers)

E.B. WHITE READ-ALOUD AWARD – MIDDLE READER HONOR AWARDS
 The False Prince, by Jennifer A. Nielsen (Scholastic)
 The Last Dragonslayer: The Chronicles of Kazam Book I, by Jasper Fforde (Harcourt Children's Books)
 The One and Only Ivan, by Katherine Applegate, Patricia Castelao (Illus.) (HarperCollins)
 Same Sun Here, by Silas House and Neela Vaswani (Candlewick)
 Three Times Lucky, by Sheila Turnage (Dial Books for Young Readers)
E.B. WHITE READ-ALOUD AWARD – PICTURE BOOK HONOR AWARDS
 Creepy Carrots! by Aaron Reynolds, Peter Brown (Illus.) (Simon & Schuster Books for Young Readers)
 Bear Has a Story to Tell, by Philip C. Stead, Erin Stead (Illus.) (Roaring Brook Press)
 Oh, No! by Candace Fleming, Eric Rohmann (Illus.) (Schwartz & Wade)
 Too Tall Houses, by Gianna Marino (Viking Juvenile)
 Z is for Moose, by Kelly Bingham, Paul O. Zelinsky (Illus.) (Greenwillow Books)

2012
Winners:

Picture Book
 I Want My Hat Back, by Jon Klassen (Candlewick Press)
Middle Reader

(Balloting ended in a tie between the works of sister and brother Maile Meloy and Colin Meloy.)
 The Apothecary, by Maile Meloy, Ian Schoenherr (Illus.) (Putnam Juvenile)
 Wildwood, by Colin Meloy, Carson Ellis (Illus.) (Balzer + Bray)
Picture Book Honor Awards:
 King Hugo's Huge Ego, by Chris Van Dusen (Candlewick Press)
 Press Here, by Hervé Tullet (Chronicle Books)
 Stars, by Mary Lyn Ray, Marla Frazee (Illus.) (Beach Lane Books)
 Over and Under the Snow, by Kate Messner, Christopher Silas Neal (Illus.) (Chronicle Books)
 Goodnight, Goodnight, Construction Site, by Sherri Duskey Rinker, Tom Lichtenheld (Illus.) (Chronicle Books)
Middle Reader Honor Awards:
 Bluefish, by Pat Schmatz (Candlewick Press)
 The Cheshire Cheese Cat: A Dickens of a Tale, by Carmen Agra Deedy and Randall Wright, Barry Moser (Illus.) (Peachtree)
 The Flint Heart, by Katherine Paterson and John Paterson, John Rocco (Illus.) (Candlewick Press)
 Liesl & Po, by Lauren Oliver, Kei Acedera (Illus.) (HarperCollins)

2011
Picture Books — Children Make Terrible Pets by Peter Brown (Little, Brown)
Older Readers — The Strange Case of Origami Yoda by Tom Angleberger (Amulet Books)

2010
Picture Books — The Curious Garden by Peter Brown (Little, Brown)
Middle Reader Honor Awards - Because of Mr. Terupt by Rob Buyea
Older Readers — The Brilliant Fall of Gianna Z. by Kate Messner (Walker Books for Young Readers)

2009
Picture Books — A Visitor for Bear by Bonnie Becker, illustrated by Kady MacDonald Denton (Candlewick Press)
Older Readers — Masterpiece by Elise Broach, illustrated by Kelly Murphy (Henry Holt and Company)

2008 

Picture Books — When Dinosaurs Came With Everything by Elise Broach (Atheneum Books)
Older Readers--The Mysterious Benedict Society by Trenton Lee Stewart (Little, Brown)

2007 
Picture Books--Houndsley and Catina by James Howe, illustrated by Marie-Louise Gay (Candlewick Press)
Older Readers--Alabama Moon by Watt Key (Farrar, Straus and Giroux)

2006 
Picture Books--If I Built a Car by Chris Van Dusen (Penguin Putnam)
Older Readers--Each Little Bird That Sings by Debra Wiles (Harcourt)

2005 
Single Award--Wild About Books by Judy Sierra, illustrated by Marc Brown (Random House)

2004 
Single Award--SkippyJon Jones by Judy Schachner (Penguin Putnam)

References

External links 
 

 The E.B. White Read Aloud Awards
 The E.B. White Read Aloud Awards winners 2008

American children's literary awards
Awards established in 2004